This is a glossary of firefighting equipment.

A

B

C

D

E

F

G

H

I

J

K

L

M

N

O

P

Q

R

S

T

U

V

W

Y

Z

See also 
 Glossary of firefighting terms
 List of basic firefighting topics
 Women in firefighting

Notes

References
 IFSTA (2008). Essentials of Fire Fighting and Fire Department Operations, 5th Edition.

External links 

 
Equipment
Firefighting equipment
Wikipedia glossaries using description lists